The Dingoo SDK is a software development kit for the Dingoo A320 video game console and other compatible devices, such as the Gemei X760+ and Dingoo A330.

History

Dingoo SDK was originally developed by Ben Brewer (aka flatmush) and first released publicly as a set of source files containing wrappers implementing basic libc functionality along with samples on how to use them.

The project grew with many people making contributions to the SDK and to the Dingoo scene in general until March 10, 2010 when the project was moved to googlecode and an official source tree was begun.

Libraries

Projects

Several projects have been developed using the SDK:

Licensing

Dingoo SDK is released under the GNU LGPL, a permissive free software licence, and is free software.

References

External links
 
 Project Wiki
 Original release page

Free computer libraries
Free software programmed in C
Software development kits